Hippotion psammochroma is a moth of the  family Sphingidae. It is found in Burkina Faso. It was described by Jean-Pierre Lequeux in 1989.

References

 Lequeux (J.-P.), 1989. Deux nouveaux lépidoptères du Burkina Faso (Sphingidae et Saturniidae). Bulletin de la Société Sciences Nat, 62.
 Pinhey (E.), 1962. Hawk Moths of Central and Southern Africa, Longmans Southern Africa, Cape Town.

Hippotion
Moths described in 1989